Zinc finger protein 394 is a protein that in humans is encoded by the ZNF394 gene.

References

Further reading 

Human proteins